The field hockey tournament at the 2003 Pan American Games was held in the Santo Domingo Stadium, Santo Domingo, Dominican Republic  from August 1–17, 2003. It served as a qualification tournament for the 2004 Summer Olympics in Athens, Greece. First place received a ticket for the Olympic tournament. The men competed for the tenth time at the Pan Americans, the women for the fifth time.

Medal summary

Medal table

Events

Qualification
A total of eight men's and eight women's teams qualified to compete at the games. The eight quotas in both the men's and women's tournaments were the same, consisting of the following:

 Host nation. 
 Defending champions. 
 Top two placed teams at the Central American and Caribbean Games.
 Highest placed team at the men's and women's South American Championship, not already qualified. 
 The three remaining quotas were awarded to the highest placed teams from the men's and women's Pan American Cups.

Each nation was entitled to enter 16 athletes per team, for a total of 256 athletes across both competitions.

Men's Qualification
The qualification route for the men's tournament is as follows.

Women's Qualification
The qualification route for the women's tournament is as follows.

Men's competition

The competition consisted of two stages; a preliminary round followed by a classification round.

Preliminary round

Pool A

Pool B

Medal round

Women's competition

The competition consisted of two stages; a preliminary round followed by a classification round.

Preliminary round

Pool A

Pool B

Medal round

References

External links
Official website (women)

 
Pan American
2003
2003
Events at the 2003 Pan American Games
2003 Pan American Games